Alvy (also known as Stringtown from the oil boom days c. 1890s - 1910 because the estimated population of 5000 residents and temporary workers were strung over the hills and hollows hence the nickname Stringtown) is an unincorporated community in Tyler County, West Virginia, United States. Alvy is located along County Route 13 (a.k.a. Alvy was once Moore, VA changed to Alvy c. 1850 and had a post office, which closed on February 1, 1997; the post office used the name Alvy.

References

Unincorporated communities in Tyler County, West Virginia
Unincorporated communities in West Virginia